The Bailo of Corfu  was the leader of the Venetian delegation to the island of Corfu who oversaw the affairs of the island while under Venetian rule and protected the commercial and military interests of the Republic of Venice. The first mention of a bailo in Corfu is in 1386 and is found in a Greek chronicle. The bailo of Corfu is also mentioned in a document by historian Marco Guazzo from 1544.

Amongst the Venetian provincial administrators, the Duke of Candia was the foremost, followed in order of seniority by the leaders of Negroponte, Corfu, Modon and Coron and Argos-Nauplion. The bailo of Corfu also administered the affairs of the Venetian dependencies of Butrinto and Lepanto in the mainland. Pantaleone Barbo was the first bailo of Corfu. The bailo of Corfu also made reports and recommendations to Venice regarding the construction of fortifications on the island.

Historical background
To protect its military and commercial interests the Republic of Venice had established missions in key locations in the Ionian Sea and the Aegean. The Venetian missions were called reggimenti and their leaders were elected by the Senate of Venice or its Great Council. The leaders were elected for terms ranging between approximately 16 months to three years.

The general title of the leaders was Rettore, translated as rector. However the specific title awarded the rector varied depending on the location they administered. Thus in the Kingdom of Candia the leader was called Duca, in Zante the term was Conte and in Corfu the leader of the regiment was given the title of Bailo.

Being elected Rettore was an honour and established that the elected leader had the confidence of his peers in the Senate and Great Council and, although a mission in the overseas protectorates of Venice was expensive and dangerous, many Venetian noblemen lobbied for the position. Cuprus, Candia and possibly Corfu were considered the top locations of the Venetian realm.

The position of Bailo of Corfu was considered prestigious. In one occasion when Gian Matteo, after retiring as Rettore of Cattaro, lost the election to the position in Corfu, he was consoled by Pietro, a Venetian nobleman:

Communication with Venice

During the Ottoman invasion of Albania, the bailo of Corfu sent intelligence to the Venetian Senate advising them of the Ottoman gains after they took Rugina, known at the time as the "Lady of Valona", and Valona proper. The Venetians were very concerned about the Ottoman incursions which threatened the dominion and commerce of Venice and its dependencies in the Adriatic and the Strait of Otranto.

The bailo of Corfu also sent messages to Venice regarding his ideas about fortifications. In 1538 in one such message the bailo of Corfu remarked:

Baili
This list is derived from Karl Hopf, Chroniques gréco-romanes inédites ou peu connues (Berlin: Weidmann, 1873), pp. 392–96.

In 1386, Venice was represented at Corfu by three provveditori: Michele Contarini, Saracino Dandolo and Marino Malipiero. There followed a series of baili that lasted down to the end of the republic:

See also
 Bailo of Constantinople
 Bailo of Negroponte
 Stato da Màr

References

Baili
History of Corfu
Venetian rule in the Ionian Islands